Rehimena surusalis is a species of moth of the family Crambidae described by Francis Walker in 1859. It is known from Australia (including New South Wales), China (including Hong Kong), the Andaman Islands, Sri Lanka, Indonesia, Taiwan, Korea and Japan.

The wingspan is about 16 mm.

The larvae bore in the buds of Hibiscus tiliaceus.

References

External links
CSIRO Ecosystem Sciences - Australian Moths Online
Japanese Moths

Spilomelinae
Moths of Japan
Moths described in 1859